PUF may refer to:

Physical unclonable function, in computer security, a physically-implemented secure identifier
 The University Presses of France
Permanent University Fund, for Texas public universities
Pau Pyrénées Airport in France (IATA code: PUF)

Por Um Fio, a Brazilian reality television show
Poughkeepsie Underwear Factory, a historic building in New York
Public Universal Friend (1752–1819), American preacher